Carl Fedor Eduard Herbert von Bose (16 March 1893, Straßburg – 30 June 1934, Berlin) was head of the press division of the Vice Chancellery (Reichsvizekanzlei) in Germany under Vice Chancellor Franz von Papen. A conservative opponent of the Nazi regime, Bose was murdered during the Night of the Long Knives in the summer of 1934.

Life and activities

Imperial Germany and Weimar Republic (1893–1933) 
During the First World War, Bose served as an Intelligence Officer in the Imperial German Army. After the war he continued to work in the field of intelligence gathering and espionage, first for the Black Reichswehr and later for the private Telegraph Union, a company owned by the politician and media mogul Alfred Hugenberg. In 1931 Bose was summoned to the Prussian State Ministry, where he was assigned to head the Press Department. On top of that he acted as a right-hand-man of the conservative politician Otto Schmidt-Hannover (DNVP). In the autumn of 1931 Bose organised the so-called "Harzburger Tagung" (Harzburg conference) a gathering of right-wing political forces including the Nazi Party, the DNVP, the Agrarian Federation, and the paramilitary Stahlhelm.

Although a confirmed anti-communist and skeptical about the functionality of democracy as a form of government, Bose at that time came to reject National Socialism as a possible cure for the political ailments of Germany on various grounds, not the least of which was his personal detestation of the Nazi Party leader Adolf Hitler, whom he deemed a vulgar rabble-rouser.

Oppositional activities (1933–1934) 

In early 1933 Bose was appointed as Chief of the Press Division in the office of Hitler's Vice-Chancellor Franz von Papen. Since Papen failed in the task he had been assigned by Reichspresident von Hindenburg, to act as a "chaperon" and corrective of Hitler and the other radicals in the government, Bose and other leading men on Papen's staff decided to take care of that task themselves. Together with his assistant Wilhelm von Ketteler, Papen's speech writer and spin doctor Edgar Jung, and Papen's aides Fritz Günther von Tschirschky and Hans Graf von Kageneck, Bose formed a pocket of resistance against the National Socialist system that was later referred to as "the vanguard of conservative resistance".

In order to overthrow the not-yet fully consolidated regime, Bose and his colleagues plotted to create an atmosphere of critical political tensions in Germany that would allow them to prompt the old President von Hindenburg – who retained the position of Commander in Chief of the Germany Army – to declare a state of national emergency. As a consequence, the Hitler government was to be stripped of the executive power in Germany, which Hindenburg was to take over by himself, in practice to be exercised by Papen's aides themselves and the Generals, for the Reichswehr. The army was to disarm the SA- and SS-troopers by force and to apprehend the major Nazi leaders, except for Hitler and Göring. Those two were to join a Reich-directorate that was to consist of Papen, former Chancellor Heinrich Brüning, conservative politician Carl Friedrich Goerdeler, the two Nazi leaders and the General  Werner Freiherr von Fritsch. The ulterior motive of this action was to be a tactical one: to calm the masses of Nazi-supporters and prevent them from resorting to active resistance against the conservative coup. Hitler and Göring were supposed to be jettisoned somewhere along the track as soon as the position of their conservative counterparts had consolidated.

In early June 1934 that plan was jeopardized when Hindenburg – earlier than in previous years – left Berlin for his estate at Neudeck in East Prussia, thus becoming harder to contact. On top of that problem, it had recently become clear that Hindenburg was seriously ill and probably had only a few more weeks to live, so could not be expected to return from Neudeck at all. Pressured by this turn of events, Bose and his colleagues decided to accelerate the eruption of the smouldering crisis that existed in Germany in those months due to the conflict between Hitler's SA, which demanded to be promoted to the position of Germany's regular army, and the Reichswehr, which intended to defend its own status.

While Bose and Tschirschky were drawing up a special dossier that was to be handed over to the elderly Hindenburg in late June 1934, to convince him of the necessity of mobilising the Reichswehr against the SA and the Nazi Party, Papen delivered his famed address at the University of Marburg on June 17, 1934, which criticized some of the excesses of Nazi rule and called for a cessation of violence and the return of the rule of law. This speech, delivered by Papen but unbeknownst to the public actually written by Jung, was intended to serve as a signal to all opposition forces in Germany to prepare to rise up against National Socialism and simultaneously to enforce the escalation of the tensions between the SA and the Reichswehr, to underline for Hindenburg the thesis presented in the Bose-Tschirschky Dossier.

However, even though the Marburg Speech turned out to be a success – as the American Ambassador to Berlin William Dodd noted in those days the provocative greeting "Heil Marburg" quickly became omnipresent in Germany – the plan by Bose, Jung, and Tschirschky did not come to fruition: The golden opportunity of the situation was thrown away by the tentative attitude of Papen, who could not bring himself to travel to Hindenburg immediately after the success of the speech became obvious, and by the clumsiness of Hindenburg's son,  who clumsily spilled the beans about the Bose-Tschirschky Plan to the Army Minister, Blomberg, and his Chief of Staff, Reichenau, who was in league with Heinrich Himmler and Reinhard Heydrich.

On the morning of June 30, between 10.00 AM and 11.00 AM, only a few hours before Papen intended finally to fly to Neudeck to get the support of Hindenburg, the Vice-Chancellery was occupied by an SS-squad and a few Gestapo inspectors. Bose was conducted into a conference room – allegedly to be interrogated – and shot ten times from behind as he sat down. Tschirschky was arrested and later released, while Jung – who had already been arrested on June 25 – was shot later that day. The whole event took place as a part of the Blood Purge which developed during the remainder of the same day, June 30, 1934.

In his memoirs Inside the Third Reich, Albert Speer relates how he was ordered to rebuild the Borsig Palace, to transfer the leaders of the Sturmabteilung (SA) in, and to have all Papen's staff out, within twenty-four hours. Speer writes:

"Twenty-four hours later they moved out. In one of the rooms I saw a large pool of dried blood on the floor. There, on June 30, Herbert von Bose, one of Papen's assistants, had been shot. I looked away and from then on avoided the room. But the incident did not affect me any more deeply than that."

Literature 
 Larry Eugene Jones: "The Limits of Collaboration. Edgar Jung, Herbert von Bose, and the Origins of the Conservative Resistance to Hitler, 1933-34", in: Larry Eugene Jones/ James Retallack [Eds.]: Between Reform, Reaction, and Resistance. Studies in the History of German Conservatism from 1789 to 1945, Providence 1993, pp. 465–501.
 Rainer Orth: "Der Amtssitz der Opposition"?: Politik und Staatsumbaupläne im Büro des Stellvertreters des Reichskanzlers in den Jahren 1933–1934, Böhlau, Cologne 2016.

Notes

See also
 Borsig Palace
 Edgar Julius Jung
 Erich Klausener
 Franz von Papen
 Night of the Long Knives

1893 births
1934 deaths
People from Strasbourg
People from Alsace-Lorraine
Saxon nobility
20th-century German politicians
Conservative Revolutionary movement
German Army personnel of World War I
Victims of the Night of the Long Knives
Executed people from Alsace
German whistleblowers
German anti-communists
People executed by Nazi Germany by firearm